The given name or nickname Moe, often short for Maurice, Moab, Morris, Mortimer, Morton, Murray, Mohammed, Moore, Moses, Mordecai, or other given names. It may refer to:

Arts and entertainment
 Murray Moe Berg (musician) (born 1959), Canadian singer-songwriter and record producer
 Moe Dunford (born 1987), Irish actor
 Moses Moe Howard (1897-1975), American actor and comedian, leader of the Three Stooges
 Moe Jaffe (1901-1972), songwriter and bandleader
 Morris Moe Koffman (1928-2001), Canadian flautist and saxophonist
 Moe Oshikiri (born 1979), Japanese model
 Moe Purtill (1916–1994), American swing jazz drummer
 Maureen Moe Tucker (born 1944), American musician and singer, drummer of the rock band the Velvet Underground
 Moe Kamikokuryo (born 1999), Japanese singer and member of the girl group Angerme

Sports
 Moe Araki (born 1998), Japanese female badminton player
 Morris Moe Berg (1902-1972), American Major League Baseball catcher and spy
 Myron Moe Drabowsky (1935-2006), American Major League Baseball pitcher
 Henry Moe Iba (born 1939), American college basketball coach
 Maurice Moe Lemay (born 1962), Canadian retired National Hockey League player
 Maurice Moe Mantha Sr. (1933-2015), Canadian hockey player and politician
 Maurice Moe Mantha Jr. (born 1961), American retired National Hockey League player
, Japanese women's basketball player
 Murray Moe Norman (1929-2004), Canadian golfer
 Maurice Moe Racine (1937-2018), former Canadian Football League player, member of the Canadian Football Hall of Fame
 Morris Moe Savransky (born 1929), American Major League Baseball pitcher
 Moe or Mose Solomon (1900-1966), the "Rabbi of Swat", American Major League Baseball outfielder
 Moritz "Moe" Wagner (born 1997), German basketball player
 Moe Win (footballer) (born 1988), footballer from Myanmar

Business and crime
 Morris Moe Dalitz (1899-1989), American gangster and businessman
 Moe Sedway (1894–1952), Polish-American businessman and gangster
 "Moe the Gimp", nickname of American gangster Martin Snyder (1893-1981)

Politics
 Moe Amery (born 1954), Canadian politician
 Maurice Moe Mantha Sr. (born 1933-2015), Canadian hockey player and politician
 Mohammed bin Abdulla Al Thani, member of the Qatari House of Al Thani in Sharjah, UAE
 Munmohan Moe Sihota (born 1955), Canadian former broadcaster and politician

Academics
 Moe Z. Win, Burmese-American mathematician and electrical engineer

See also
 Moe (disambiguation)
 Mo (given name)
 Five Guys Named Moe

English masculine given names
English-language masculine given names
Hypocorisms
Japanese feminine given names